French orthography encompasses the spelling and punctuation of the French language. It is based on a combination of phonemic and historical principles. The spelling of words is largely based on the pronunciation of Old French c. 1100–1200 AD, and has stayed more or less the same since then, despite enormous changes to the pronunciation of the language in the intervening years. Even in the late 17th century, with the publication of the first French dictionary by the Académie française, there were attempts to reform French orthography.

This has resulted in a complicated relationship between spelling and sound, especially for vowels; a multitude of silent letters; and many homophones—e.g., ///// (all pronounced ) and // (all pronounced ). Later attempts to respell some words in accordance with their Latin etymologies further increased the number of silent letters (e.g.,  vs. older  – compare English "tense", which reflects the original spelling – and  vs. older ).

Nevertheless, there are rules governing French orthography which allow for a reasonable degree of accuracy when pronouncing French words from their written forms. The reverse operation, producing written forms from pronunciation, is much more ambiguous.  The French alphabet uses a number of diacritics including the circumflex. A system of braille has been developed for people who are visually impaired.

Alphabet

The French alphabet is based on the 26 letters of the Latin alphabet, uppercase and lowercase, with five diacritics and two orthographic ligatures.

{| class="wikitable"
!Letter
!Name 
!Name (IPA)
!Diacritics and ligatures
|-
| A || a ||  ||Àà, Ââ, Ææ
|-
| B || bé ||  ||
|-
| C || cé ||  ||Çç
|-
| D || dé ||  ||
|-
| E || e ||  ||Éé, Èè, Êê, Ëë
|-
| F || effe ||  ||
|-
| G || gé ||  ||
|-
| H || ache ||  ||
|-
| I || i ||  ||Îî, Ïï
|-
| J || ji ||  ||
|-
| K || ka ||  ||
|-
| L || elle ||  ||
|-
| M || emme ||  ||
|-
| N || enne ||  ||
|-
| O || o ||  ||Ôô, Œœ
|-
| P || pé ||  ||
|-
| Q || qu ||  ||
|-
| R || erre ||  ||
|-
| S || esse ||  ||
|-
| T || té ||  ||
|-
| U || u ||  ||Ùù, Ûû, Üü
|-
| V || vé ||  ||
|-
| W || double vé ||  ||
|-
| X || ixe ||  ||
|-
| Y || i grec ||  ||Ÿÿ
|-
| Z || zède ||  ||
|}
The phoneme  sound is usually written ; the  sound is usually written  anywhere but before ,  before , and sometimes  at the ends of words. However,  is common in the metric prefix kilo- (originally from Greek  khilia "a thousand"): kilogramme, kilomètre, kilowatt, kilohertz, etc.

Diacritics
The usual diacritics are the acute (accent aigu), the grave (accent grave), the circumflex (accent circonflexe), the diaeresis (tréma), and the cedilla (cédille). Diacritics have no effect on the primary alphabetical order.

 The acute accent or accent aigu (é), over e, indicates uniquely the sound . An é in modern French is often used where a combination of e and a consonant, usually s, would have been used formerly: écouter < escouter.
 The grave accent or accent grave (à, è, ù), over a or u, is used primarily to distinguish homophones: à ("to") vs. a ("has"); ou ("or") vs. où ("where"; note that the letter ù is used only in this word). Over an e, indicates the sound  in positions where a plain e would be pronounced as /ə/ (schwa). Many verb conjugations contain regular alternations between è and e; for example, the accent mark in the present tense verb lève [lεv] distinguishes the vowel's pronunciation from the schwa in the infinitive, lever [ləve].
In Belgian French, ê is pronounced . Most often, it indicates the historical deletion of an adjacent letter (usually an s or a vowel): château < castel, fête < feste, sûr < seur, dîner < disner (in medieval manuscripts many letters were often written as diacritical marks: the circumflex for "s" and the tilde for "n" are examples). It has also come to be used to distinguish homophones: du ("of the") vs. dû (past participle of devoir "to have to do something (pertaining to an act)"); however dû is in fact written thus because of a dropped e: deu (see Circumflex in French). Since the 1990 orthographic changes, the circumflex on most i's and u's may be dropped when it does not serve to distinguish homophones: chaîne becomes chaine but sûr (sure) does not change because it distinguishes the word from sur (on).
 The diaeresis or tréma (ë, ï, ü, ÿ), over e, i, u or y,  indicates that a vowel is to be pronounced separately from the preceding one: naïve , Noël . The diaeresis may indicate either vowels in hiatus, as in naïve, or a glide/diphthong, as in naïad .
The combination of e with diaeresis following o (as in Noël) is pronounced in the regular way if followed by n (Samoëns , but note Citroën )
The combination of e with diaeresis following a is either pronounced  (Raphaël, Israël ) or not pronounced, leaving only the a (Staël ); it is pronounced as an if aë is followed by n (Saint-Saëns )
A diaeresis on y only occurs in some proper names and in modern editions of old French texts. Some proper names in which ÿ appears include Aÿ  (commune in Marne, now Aÿ-Champagne), Rue des Cloÿs  (alley in the 18th arrondissement of Paris), Croÿ  (family name and hotel on the Boulevard Raspail, Paris), Château du Feÿ ? (near Joigny), Ghÿs ? (name of Flemish origin spelt Ghĳs where ĳ in handwriting looked like ÿ to French clerks), L'Haÿ-les-Roses  (commune between Paris and Orly airport), Pierre Louÿs  (author), Moÿ-de-l'Aisne  (commune in Aisne and a family name), and Le Blanc de Nicolaÿ  (an insurance company in eastern France).
The diaeresis on u appears in the Biblical proper names Archélaüs ?, Capharnaüm  (with the um pronounced  as in words of Latin origin such as album, maximum, or chemical element names such as sodium, aluminium), Emmaüs , Ésaü , and Saül , as well as French names such as Haüy . Nevertheless, since the 1990 orthographic changes, the diaeresis in words containing guë (such as aiguë  or ciguë ) may be moved onto the u: aigüe, cigüe, and by analogy may be used in verbs such as j'argüe. Without a diaeresis, the ue would be silent (or a schwa in those accents which retain one): Aigues-Mortes .
 The cedilla or cédille (ç), under c, indicates that it is pronounced  rather than /k/. Thus je lance "I throw" (with c =  before e), je lançais "I was throwing" (c would be pronounced  before a without the cedilla). The cedilla is only used before the vowels a, o or u, for example, ça /sa/; it is never used before the vowels e,  i, or y, since these three vowels always produce a soft /s/ sound (ce, ci, cycle).

The tilde diacritical mark ( ˜ ) above n is occasionally used in French for words and names of Spanish origin that have been incorporated into the language (e.g., El Niño). Like the other diacritics, the tilde has no impact on the primary alphabetical order.

Diacritics are often omitted on capital letters, mainly for technical reasons. It is widely believed that they are not required; however both the Académie française and the Office québécois de la langue française reject this usage and confirm that "in French, the accent has full orthographic value", except for acronyms but not for abbreviations (e.g., CEE, ALENA, but É.-U.). Nevertheless, diacritics are often ignored in word games, including crosswords, Scrabble, and Des chiffres et des lettres.

Ligatures
The two ligatures œ and æ have orthographic value. For determining alphabetical order, these ligatures are treated like the sequences oe and ae.

Œ
It usually appears in the combination œu; œil  "eye" is an exception. Many of these words were originally written with the digraph eu; the o in the ligature represents a sometimes artificial attempt to imitate the Latin spelling: Latin bovem > Old French buef/beuf > Modern French bœuf.

Œ is also used in words of Greek origin, as the Latin rendering of the Greek diphthong οι, e.g., cœlacanthe "coelacanth".

The ligature œ is not used when both letters contribute different sounds. For example, when  is part of a prefix (coexister), or when  is part of a suffix (minoen), or in the word moelle and its derivatives.

Æ
(a-e entrelacé or a, e collés/liés) This ligature is rare, appearing only in some words of Latin and Greek origin like tænia, ex æquo, cæcum, æthuse (as named dog’s parsley). It generally represents the vowel , like .

The sequence  appears in loanwords where both sounds are heard, as in maestro and paella.

Digraphs and trigraphs

French digraphs and trigraphs have both historical and phonological origins.

Spelling to sound correspondences
Some exceptions apply to the rules governing the pronunciation of word-final consonants. See Liaison (French) for details.

For example, in rail,  is pronounced ; in mouiller,  is pronounced .

There are no longer silent k's in French.

Words from Greek
The spelling of French words of Greek origin is complicated by a number of digraphs which originated in the Latin transcriptions. Further, many words in the international scientific vocabulary were constructed in French from Greek roots and have kept their digraphs (e.g., stratosphère, photographie).

History

The Oaths of Strasbourg from 842 is the earliest text written in the early form of French called Romance or Gallo-Romance.

Roman
The Gaulish language of the inhabitants of Gaul disappeared progressively over the course of Roman rule as the Latin language began to replace it. Vulgar Latin, a generally lower register of Classical Latin spoken by the Roman soldiers, merchants and even patricians in quotidian speech, and adopted by the natives, evolved slowly, taking the forms of different spoken Roman vernaculars according to the region of the empire.

Eventually the different forms of Vulgar Latin would evolve into three branches in the Gallo-Romance language sub-family, the langues d'oïl north of the Loire, the langues d'oc in the south, and the Franco-Provençal languages in part of the east.

Old French
In the 9th century, the Romance vernaculars were already quite far from Latin. For example, to understand the Bible, written in Latin, footnotes were necessary. With consolidation of royal power, beginning in the 13th century, the Francien vernacular, the langue d'oil variety in usage then on the Île-de-France (region around Paris), brought it little by little to the other languages and evolved toward Classic French.

The languages found in the manuscripts dating from the 9th century to the 13th century form what is known as Old French or ancien français. These languages continued to evolve until, in the 14th century to the 16th century, Middle French (moyen français) emerged.

Middle French

During the Middle French period (c. 1300–1600), modern spelling practices were largely established. This happened especially during the 16th century, under the influence of printers. However, many other distinctions that had become equally superfluous were maintained, e.g. between s and soft c or between ai and ei. It is likely that etymology was the guiding factor here: the distinctions s/c and ai/ei reflect corresponding distinctions in the spelling of the underlying Latin words, whereas no such distinction exists in the case of eu/ue.

This period also saw the development of some explicitly etymological spellings, e.g. temps ("time"), vingt ("twenty") and poids ("weight") (note that in many cases, the etymologizing was sloppy or occasionally completely incorrect; vingt reflects Latin viginti, with the g in the wrong place, and poids actually reflects Latin pensum, with no d at all; the spelling poids is due to an incorrect derivation from Latin pondus). The trend towards etymologizing sometimes produced absurd (and generally rejected) spellings such as sçapvoir for normal savoir ("to know"), which attempted to combine Latin sapere ("to be wise", the correct origin of savoir) with scire ("to know").

Classical French

Modern French spelling was codified in the late 17th century by the Académie française, based largely on previously established spelling conventions.  Some reforms have occurred since then, but most have been fairly minor.  The most significant changes have been:

Adoption of j and v to represent consonants, in place of former i and u.
Addition of a circumflex accent to reflect historical vowel length. During the Middle French period, a distinction developed between long and short vowels, with long vowels largely stemming from a lost /s/ before a consonant, as in même (cf. Spanish mismo), but sometimes from the coalescence of similar vowels, as in âge from earlier aage, eage (early Old French *edage < Vulgar Latin *aetaticum, cf. Spanish edad < aetate(m)).  Prior to this, such words continued to be spelled historically (e.g. mesme and age).  Ironically, by the time this convention was adopted in the 19th century, the former distinction between short and long vowels had largely disappeared in all but the most conservative pronunciations, with vowels automatically pronounced long or short depending on the phonological context (see French phonology).
The most significant effect of this was to change the spelling of all imperfect verbs (formerly spelled -ois, -oit, -oient rather than -ais, -ait, -aient), as well as the name of the language, from françois to français.

Modern French

In October 1989, Michel Rocard, then-Prime Minister of France, established the High Council of the French Language in Paris. He designated experts — among them linguists, representatives of the Académie française and lexicographers — to propose standardizing several points, a few of those points being:
The uniting hyphen in all compound numerals
i.e. trente-et-un
The plural of compound words, the second element of which always takes the plural s
For example un après-midi, des après-midis
The circumflex accent  disappears on all u's and i's except for words in which it is needed for differentiation
As in coût (cost) → cout, abîme (abyss) → abime but sûr (sure) because of sur (on)
The past participle of laisser followed by an infinitive verb is invariable (now works the same way as the verb faire)
elle s'est laissée mourir → elle s'est laissé mourir

Quickly, the experts set to work. Their conclusions were submitted to Belgian and Québécois linguistic political organizations. They were likewise submitted to the Académie française, which endorsed them unanimously, saying: 
"Current orthography remains that of usage, and the 'recommendations' of the High Council of the French language only enter into play with words that may be written in a different manner without being considered as incorrect or as faults."

The changes were published in the Journal officiel de la République française in December 1990. At the time the proposed changes were considered to be suggestions. In 2016, schoolbooks in France began to use the newer recommended spellings, with instruction to teachers that both old and new spellings be deemed correct.

Punctuation

In France and Belgium, the exclamation mark, question mark, semicolon, colon, percentage mark, currency symbols, hash, and guillemet all require a non-breaking space before and after the punctuation mark. Outside of France and Belgium, this rule is often ignored. Computer software may aid or hinder the application of this rule, depending on the degree of localisation, as it is marked differently from most other Western punctuation.

Hyphens 
The hyphen in French has a particular use in geographic names that is not found in English.
Traditionally, the "specific" part of placenames, street names, and organization names are hyphenated (usually namesakes). 
For instance,  (Square of the Battle of Stalingrad []); 

The names of Montreal Metro stations are consistently hyphenated when suitable, but those of Paris Métro stations mostly ignore this rule. (For more examples, see Trait d'union)

See also
Elision (French)
French phonology
French braille
French manual alphabet
Circumflex in French
French heteronyms, words spelled the same but pronounced differently

Notes

References

Bibliography

External links
Alternate French spelling 
Recording of 3 different voices pronouncing the French alphabet
French alphabet pronounced by a native speaker (Youtube)

Orthography
Indo-European Latin-script orthographies